The Colonel's Bequest is a character-driven graphic adventure game by Sierra On-Line featuring the character of Laura Bow. It was developed for MS-DOS in 1989. Ports for Amiga and Atari ST were released in 1990. It was the first of the short-lived Laura Bow Mysteries series created by Roberta Williams, which used many elements from the game Mystery House. The Colonel's Bequest was created with SCI0, and employed 4-bit color (16 colors) and a typing interface. Its sequel The Dagger of Amon Ra was released in 1992.

Gameplay 
The Colonel's Bequest is one of the few Sierra On-Line adventure games to focus more on the characters than puzzles. Although solving puzzles is required to obtain a high score, it is more important to discover information about the characters' backgrounds and relationships with each other. Regardless of the importance of these elements, it is possible to finish the game without solving any puzzles, discovering many important details about the characters, or even identifying the murderer.

Although some actions are recorded and scored at the end of the game, there is no discernible point system. In order to aid the player in achieving a higher score during their next attempt, upon completion of the game, it reveals hints and information about things that were missed. This implies that the game is intended to be replayed.

The game's characters make plans to be in certain places at certain times, which allows the player to follow them. Characters may get annoyed with the protagonist Laura Bow if they catch her snooping on them or asking too many questions, although this is obvious only in dialogue and the plot is not affected.

Death lurks around every corner, but Laura is almost never threatened by the mysterious villain because she is not related to the Dijon family. Staying consistent with other Sierra adventure games, most deaths experienced by the player occur by accident or misadventures such as falling off a balcony, or being crushed by a falling chandelier. However, the player may be killed by the murderer in the later phases of the game. For example, the murderer's arm reaches out at specific locations and snatches Laura away. In another case, the murderer appears in the darkness and strangles Laura to death. One of the more notable non-accidental deaths occurs when the player simply attempts to shower: the murderer stabs Laura in a reference to the Alfred Hitchcock film Psycho.

The game's unusual title can be attributed to Sierra's long-standing tradition of including "Quest" in the title of nearly every graphical adventure they published. A bequest is a legacy or gift handed down to someone in a will.

Plot 
The Colonel's Bequest is set in 1925. The game's main character is Laura Bow, a Tulane University student, daughter of a detective, and an aspiring journalist. Laura is invited by her flapper friend, Lillian, to spend a weekend at the decaying sugar plantation of Colonel Dijon. When the reclusive and childless Colonel gathers his quarrelsome relatives for a reading of his will, tensions explode and the bickering leads to murder.

Throughout the game, Laura remains stranded on the island, surrounded by suspects and potential victims in a classical Agatha Christie manner. Laura's task is to learn the family secrets and ultimately, the identity of the murderer. There is also an optional subplot concerning a hidden treasure. The storyline advances by a quarter-hour when new plot elements are witnessed, with a new act beginning every hour. Sometimes a quarter-hour can advance in a few real-time seconds, if Laura happens to be at the proper place.

In the final act, Laura finds a skeleton key on Lillian's body. She can use this to open the attic door and discover Colonel Dijon and Rudy struggling over a hypodermic syringe. The ending depends on Laura's final actions. If she shoots the Colonel or lets Rudy win the fight, the Colonel will die and Rudy will claim that his uncle was the sole murderer. Laura returns home but questions whether that was the full story. If Laura instead shoots and wounds Rudy, the Colonel will reveal that Lillian was the primary murderer, but was killed by Rudy. Colonel Dijon then changes his will to leave everything to Celie, and will let Laura keep the hidden treasure if it was discovered.

Characters 
As with classic murder stories, the plot revolves around the characters, most of whom are either potential victims, or potential murderers. Most of the game characters are named after prominent figures of the time, such as Rudolph Valentino, W. C. Fields, Gloria Swanson, Clara Bow, and Clarence Darrow. Most are heavily based on well-used archetypes.
 Laura Bow – Player character, Tulane University journalism student, and daughter of detective John Bow.
 Lillian Prune – Laura's friend from Tulane. Her father committed suicide when she was young. She is also Ethel's daughter.
 Colonel Henri Dijon – A reclusive, rich, eccentric old man, who fought in the Spanish–American War and lives alone on an Antebellum sugar plantation island (as Dijon is a type of mustard, his name is a reference to the character of Colonel Mustard in the game Cluedo).
 Ethel Prune – The Colonel's younger sister and Lillian's alcoholic mother.
 Gertrude "Gertie" Dijon – The snobbish widow of the Colonel's brother, and the mother of Gloria and Rudy.
 Gloria Swansong – Gertie's daughter and Rudy's sister. She was a Hollywood actress who had gotten into some trouble and was suffering from some sort of disease.
 Rudolph "Rudy" Dijon – Gertie's son and Gloria's brother. He's a slick womanizer and gambler.
 Clarence Sparrow – Henri's sneaky lawyer and one of Gloria's previous lovers.
 Dr. Wilbur C. Feels – The Colonel's long-time and questionable personal physician.
 Fifi – The sexy French maid who lives with him and "serves" the Colonel (and secretly, also Jeeves).
 Jeeves – Butler in the Colonel's house, who usually remains silent.
 Celie – Henri's cook from New Orleans, whose parents were slaves on the plantation. She is the only character who will befriend Laura.

Release 
Originally released in 1989, the game was reissued in 1993 to supplement the release of the sequel, The Dagger of Amon Ra. This version corrects some errors with special effects (for example, the fireflies in the opening boat ride and around the dock are more visible and move less erratically). GOG.com released an emulated version for Microsoft Windows in 2017.

Reception 

Upon release, The Colonel's Bequest received positive reviews. Johnny L. Wilson from Computer Gaming World opined the game's lack of difficulty would likely disappoint "hard-core adventure gamers (i.e. inveterate puzzle-solvers)" but it succeeded as an "interactive play" that was much more story- than puzzle-driven compared to previous Sierra adventures. He praised the game's use of humor and audio, and called it a "forerunner of one style of future entertainment software".

In the May 1990 edition of Games International, Theo Clarke called the game "solid genre stuff", noting that "the theme reverts to the 'mansion murder' concept of [Roberta Williams' first program] Mystery House". He commented on the radical new approach this game takes wherein the player has the option of not taking any action except to observe, saying: "Such an approach is not very rewarding but it serves to demonstrate the essential difference between this and other games". Clarke concluded by giving the game an above-average rating of 8 out of 10 for both gameplay and graphics: "I have found all of the Sierra games quite obsessive but The Colonel's Bequest has a charm all of its own".

Retrospectively, Adventure Gamers' Johann Walter gave it four stars out of five and called it a "rather unique game [and] excellent game" wherein "[the game's director and writer] Roberta Williams showed (again) that she was a master game designer, writing one of the very few good detective games in this mold". Adventure Classic Gaming's Michelle Destefano wrote: "In the end, the Laura Bow Mystery series is among Roberta's best works, and The Colonel's Bequest is among the best murder mystery adventure games to date".

In 2011, Adventure Gamers named The Colonel's Bequest the 84th-best adventure game ever released.

Sequel 
A sequel called The Dagger of Amon Ra followed in 1992, featuring the same character Laura Bow, now a reporter in New York City investigating a series of murders one night in an Egyptian-themed museum.

References

External links 
 
 The Colonel's Bequest at the Sierra Chest
 The Colonel's Bequest at Vintage Sierra
 

1989 video games
Adventure games
Amiga games
Atari ST games
DOS games
Detective video games
Fiction set in 1925
Mystery video games
ScummVM-supported games
Sierra Entertainment games
Single-player video games
Video games featuring female protagonists
Video games set in New Orleans
Video games set in the 1920s
Video games with alternate endings
Windows games
Video games developed in the United States
Video games set in Louisiana